Are You Sleepy? is the debut album of The Gerbils.

Track listing

Personnel
Scott Spillane - Vocals, Guitar, Bass
Will Westbrook - Vocal, Guitars, Crystal Calibrator, Tape Manipulation, Bells
Jeremy Barnes - Drums, Vocals
John D'Azzo - Vocals, Guitar, Bass, Piano, Air Organ, Drums

References

The Gerbils albums
1998 debut albums